Washington Township is a township in Keokuk County, Iowa.

References

Townships in Keokuk County, Iowa
Townships in Iowa